Carl-Erik Grenness (born 18 November 1939) is a Norwegian professor of psychology.

Grenness has spent most of his career as a Professor at the University of Oslo, and has been active in many aspects of psychology, including philosophical psychology,  behavioural analysis, organisational psychology and organisational studies. He was also a scientist at the Forsvarets institutt for ledelse, and has worked as head psychologist at Forsvaret.

Bibliography (selected)
1963: Metapsykologi (with Steinar Kvale)
1996: Samfunn og Vitenskap (with Engelstad, F., Kalleberg, R. and Malnes, R. Ad Notam, Oslo
2004: Kommunikasjon i organisasjoner: innføring i kommunikasjonsteori og kommunikasjonsteknikker Abstrakt  
2004: Hva er PSYKOLOGI  
2005: Introduksjon til samfunnsfag - Vitenskapsteori, argumentasjon og faghistorie (with Fredrik Engelstad, Ragnvald Kalleberg and Raino Malnes)

References

External links
uio.no about Grenness
hio.no about Grenness

Norwegian psychologists
Academic staff of the University of Oslo
1939 births
Living people
20th-century Norwegian scientists
21st-century Norwegian scientists
20th-century Norwegian educators
21st-century Norwegian educators